Observatory Park may refer to:

Australia

 Observatory Park, Brisbane, on Wickham Terrace, Spring Hill
 Observatory Park, Sydney, in the Sydney central business district

United States

 Goldendale Observatory State Park, in Washington
 Highland Road Park Observatory, in Baton Rouge, Louisiana